Yes Your Honour is a 2006 Indian Malayalam-language film directed by V. M. Vinu. The film stars Sreenivasan, Padmapriya and Innocent.The film had musical score by Deepak Dev.

Plot 
Advocate Ravishankar is an idealist. He is practicing as the junior to a clever and cunning advocate Venugopal, who is often rude and ill-mannered towards his juniors. Ravishankar studied law with the intention of doing service to society but it didn't take much time to realize that the judiciary is filled with corruption  and has no moral values.

After years of being a junior, once Ravishankar gets a case which he can present in the court of law. But at the last minute, Venugopal gives the case to someone else. Frustrated Ravishankar beats up Venugopal and quits being junior to him. He then becomes independent and the first case that came Ravishankar's way was that of the murder of D.F.O Sarath Shetty. Venugopal appears as his opposition. The rest of the film is about Ravishankar's struggle to bring out the truth and make his mark in his career.

Ravi finds that former Minister Issac Samuel and contractor Mustafa were behind DFO's murder. Ravi is appointed as the new Public Prosecutor as new charge sheet is filed with Issac Samuel and Mustafa as accused.

He also finds out that these people are notorious underworld criminals will try to kill him and his family if necessary. So Ravi joins the villains with a secret agenda to bring these criminals to justice. Ravi found the details of the criminal history of the villains starting with their terror links, contract killings and to crores of looted wealth. With the help of his loyal friend ACP Prakash, Ravi brings these criminals to justice and proves their criminal activities in the court.

The court sentenced Issac Samuel and Mustafa to death by hanging. Two years later, both the villains were executed in Viyur central prison. Ravi leads a happy life and a successful professional career.

Cast 

 Sreenivasan as Adv. Ravishankar
 Padmapriya as Maya Ravishankar (voice by Devi )
 Innocent as Adv.Venugopal
 Saikumar as Isaac Samuel
 Ramu as Musthafa
 Thilakan as Judge Mukundan
 Jagathy Sreekumar as Mani, Ravishankar's Friend 
 Suresh Krishna as ASP Prakash, Ravishankar's Friend 
 Babu Namboothiri as Appukkuttan, Advocate Clerk
 Riyaz Khan as Gopikrishnan, brother of Maya
 Anand as DFO Sarath Shetty
 Ajith Kollam as friend of Gopikrishnan
 K. T. C. Abdullah as Kunjambu
 V. K. Sreeraman as Maya's Father
 Sreelatha Namboothiri as Maya's Mother
 Mythili Roy as Venugopal's daughter
 Varada as Ravishankar's Niece
 Poornima Anand as wife of Sr Adv Venugopal		
 Ponnamma Babu as Ravishankar's elder sister
 Geetha Nair as Mukundan's wife		
 Malavika Nair as Ravishankar's Daughter
 James as Velayudhan
 Meghanathan as Lakshmanan
 Nisha Sarang as Narayani
 Kiran Raj
 Abu Salim

Box office
The film became commercial success and ran 100 days in theatres.

References

External links

 Yes Your Honour at Indiaglitz
 Yes Your Honour at Rediff
 Yes Your Honour at One India

2006 films
2000s Malayalam-language films
Films with screenplays by T. Damodaran
Films directed by V. M. Vinu